Amt Peitz is an Amt ("collective municipality") in the district of Spree-Neiße, in Brandenburg, Germany. Its seat is in Peitz.

The Amt Peitz consists of the following municipalities:
Drachhausen
Drehnow
Heinersbrück 
Jänschwalde
Peitz 
Tauer
Teichland
Turnow-Preilack

Demography

References

External links 
 City Government website

Peitz
Spree-Neiße